Yohl Ikʼnal, also known as Lady Kan Ik and Lady Kʼanal Ikʼnal, (died 7 November 604) was queen regnant of the Maya city-state of Palenque. She acceded to the throne on 23 December 583, and ruled until her death.

Family
Yohl Ikʼnal was a grandmother or great-grandmother of Kʼinich Janaab Pakal I, Palenque's greatest king. She was a descendant of Kʼukʼ Bahlam I, the founder of the Palenque dynasty and she came to power within a year of the death of her predecessor, Kan Bahlam I.

She was the first female ruler in recorded Maya history and was one of a very few female rulers known from Maya history to have borne a full royal title. She must have come to the throne due to extremely unusual circumstances, the details of which have not survived. She was the one of two women to have ruled Palenque, second was her daughter or granddaughter Sak Kʼukʼ and was likely to have been either the sister or, more likely, the daughter of Kan Bahlam, who left no male heir. Her husband or her son was Janahb Pakal.

Reign
During the reign of Yohl Ikʼnal, Palenque suffered an important defeat by Calakmul, one of the two great Maya powers of the Classic Period. The battle took place on 23 April 599 but Yohl Ikʼnal reigned for several years more and died in 604. After the defeat, Palenque apparently maintained its political identity but Yohl Ikʼnal probably had to pay tribute to the ajaw of Calakmul. There are indications that either Yohl Ikʼnal or her successor successfully rebelled against Calakmul's dominance before 611.

Archaeologist Merle Greene Robertson has suggested that a vaulted tomb under Temple 20 at Palenque is that of Queen Yohl Ikʼnal. She was considered important enough to be depicted twice on the sarcophagus of her grandson or great-grandson Kʼinich Janaab Pakal I and to be sculpted in stucco on the wall of his tomb.

Notes

Footnotes

References

 

 
 
 

583 births
604 deaths
Maya queens
6th-century women rulers
7th-century women rulers
7th-century monarchs in North America
6th-century monarchs in North America
Rulers of Palenque
Queens regnant
6th century in the Maya civilization